The Dallas International Film Festival (DIFF), presented by Dallas Film, is an annual film festival that takes place in Dallas, Texas.

DIFF 2023 will be held April 28-May 5, 2023. The 2023 Dallas International Film Festival was cited by Travel + Leisure magazine in naming Dallas among the "12 Best Places to Travel in April 2023". The festival was also cited by MovieMaker magazine in naming Dallas among the "Best Places to Live and Work as a MovieMaker 2023".

Since its inception, the Dallas International Film Festival has contributed more than $1M in filmmaker awards, brought more than 2,000 filmmakers to Dallas, and screened more than 2,000 films from more than 50 countries.

Dallas Film, established as Dallas Film Society, Inc., is a 501(c)(3) nonprofit organization founded in 2006 to celebrate films and their impact on society, to honor filmmakers and recognize their achievements and contribution in enhancing the creative community, to provide educational programs to develop better understanding of the role of film in today's world and to promote the City of Dallas and its commitment to the art of filmmaking.

History 
2007

The Dallas International Film Festival began in 2007 as the AFI Dallas International Film Festival. The festival was cofounded by advertising executive Liener Temerlin and Deep Ellum Film Festival founder Michael Cain with the intention that "film should be placed on the same pedestal as all of the other arts". The Festival was held March 22 to April 1, 2007. The Opening Night Gala film was Steven Sawalich’s “Music Within” and Sarah Polley’s directorial debut, “Away From Her,” closed the fest. The newly inaugurated AFI Dallas Star was presented to Lauren Bacall, Jack Valenti, David Lynch, Sidney Pollack, Marvin Hamlisch, Alan and Marilyn Bergman, Sarah Polley and posthumously to Gregory Peck, who served as the first chairman of the AFI’s board.

2008

In 2008, the AFI DALLAS International Film Festival was held from March 27 to April 6, 2008. The Opening Night Gala film was Helen Hunt's directorial debut film, Then She Found Me. The Closing Night Gala film was Stuart Townsend's Battle in Seattle. Mickey Rooney attended a presentation of the 70th anniversary of Boys Town. Helen Hunt, Mickey Rooney, Charlize Theron and Todd Wagner each received the AFI DALLAS Star Award. Director Chris Wedge received the Tex Avery Animation Award, which honors lifetime achievement in animation filmmaking. Special guests included Robert DeNiro, Barry Levinson, Art Linson, Keke Palmer, Michelle Rodriguez, Stuart Townsend amongst others. 

2009

The 3rd annual festival was held from March 26 to April 2, 2009. Kathryn Bigelow was presented with the AFI DALLAS Star Award before a screening of her film, The Hurt Locker.

Adrien Brody was presented with the AFI DALLAS Star Award prior to the screening of the Opening Night Gala film, The Brothers Bloom. Robert Towne received the AFI DALLAS Star Award at a presentation of the 35th anniversary of the film, Chinatown.

2010

In 2010, the name of the festival was changed to the Dallas International Film Festival after the contract with AFI expired. Amber Heard received the inaugural DALLAS Shining Star Award and writer/director Frank Darabont received the DALLAS Star Award. The 4th annual festival was held from April 8 to April 18, 2010.

2011

In 2011, the 5th annual festival was held from March 31 to April 10, 2011. Opening night was held at the Margot and Bill Winspear Opera House in the AT&T Performing Arts Center, a location in the Arts District of downtown Dallas. The festival was dedicated to founder and chairman emeritus Liener Temerlin.

2012

The 6th annual festival was held from April 12 through April 22, 2012.

2013

In 2013, the 7th annual festival was held from April 4 through April 14, 2013, and presented more than 160 features, documentaries, shorts, and student films from 28 countries.

2014

The 8th annual festival was held from April 3 through April 13, 2014.

2015

In 2015, the 9th annual festival was held from April 9 to 19, 2015., and featured 165 films. The opening night film was I'll See You in My Dreams, starring Blythe Danner, who was present to accept the Dallas Star Award. Director John Landis (An American Werewolf in London, Coming to America, National Lampoon's Animal House, Blues Brothers) was also present to accept the Dallas Star Award. Texas writer/producer/actor L.M. Kit Carson (Paris, Texas and David Holzman's Diary) was presented with a posthumous Dallas Star Award.

2016

The 10th annual festival was held from April 14 through April 24, 2016. The opening night film was The Land, starring Erykah Badu. The Dallas Star Award was presented to cinematographer Ed Lachman and the inaugural L.M. Kit Carson Maverick Filmmaker Award was presented to Monte Hellman.

2017

In 2017, the 11th annual festival was held from March 30 through April 8, 2017. The Dallas Shining Star Award was presented to Zoey Deutch (Before I Fall). A posthumous Dallas Star Award was presented to Bill Paxton. The L.M. Kit Carson Maverick Filmmaker Award was presented to David Gordon Green.

2018

The 12th annual festival was held from May 3 through May 10, 2018. In 2018, the festival screened more than 130 films from 22 countries, including several movies that were released nationwide later in the year: Eighth Grade, Won’t You Be My Neighbor, Dead Pigs, and Blindspotting.

2019

In 2019, the 13th Dallas International Film Festival powered by Capital One was held from April 11 through April 18, 2019. The festival screened more than 130 films from more than 35 countries, including five world premieres, one U.S. premiere, 37 Texas premieres, and 15 Dallas premieres. World premieres included: After So Many Days, El Corazón de Bolívar (Bolivar's Heart), Hurdle, The Pursuit, and This World Won't Break.

2020

The 2020 Dallas International Film Festival as an in-person event was postponed due to the COVID-19 pandemic. Dallas Film presented summer drive-in movie screening events in Dallas at Four Corners Brewing Company. Dallas Film and Ozarka also collaborated to present the first-ever Ozarka® Brand Drive-In Film Festival events, held in Dallas, Austin and Houston in fall 2020.

2021

After the 2020 festival was postponed during the COVID-19 pandemic, the 2021 Dallas International Film Festival returned under the direction of artistic director James Faust with an abbreviated in-person event from October 8 through October 10, 2021, at Alamo Drafthouse Cinema - Cedars.

2022

In 2022, the Dallas International Film Festival (DIFF) returned as a seven-day festival from October 14 through October 20.  In its 16th year, DIFF presented screenings at Alamo Drafthouse Cinema - Cedars, the Morton H. Meyerson Symphony Center, Booker T. Washington High School for the Performing and Visual Arts, Texas Theatre, South Dallas Cultural Center, and 4DWN Skate Park.

2023

The 2023 edition of the Dallas International Film Festival (DIFF) will be held April 28-May 5, 2023.

Awards
2007
Target Filmmaker Award - Documentary: New Year Baby
Target Filmmaker Award - Narrative Feature: Shut Up and Shoot Me
Grand Jury Prize - Documentary: Iron Ladies of Liberia
Grand Jury Prize - Texas: A Lawyer Walks into a Bar
Student Competition: Redemption Maddie
Special Jury Prize - Best Feature Film: Eve of Understanding
Best HD Feature: Sharkwater
Audience Award - Best Short: The Little Gorilla
Audience Award - Narrative Feature: Music Within
Audience Award - Best Feature: Darius Goes West
Audience Award - Best Feature (In-Competition): Divine Souls

2008
Target Filmmaker Award - Honorable Mention: Bad Habits
Grand Jury Prize - Best Short Film: The Second Line
Special Jury Prize - Best Feature Film: Cook County
Special Jury Prize - Special Achievement (Direction): Bongo Bong - Ken Wardrop
Audience Award - Best Short: A Day's Work

2009
Target Filmmaker Award - Documentary: Prom Night in Mississippi
Target Filmmaker Award - Narrative Feature: Gigantic
Grand Jury Prize - Best Short Film: Princess Margaret Blvd.
Grand Jury Prize - Texas Competition: The Other Side of Paradise
Student Competition: Hug
Grand Jury Prize - Texas Film: St. Nick
Special Jury Prize - Best Feature Film: Against the Current
Current Energy Filmmaker Award: Crude
Audience Award - Best Short: Lucy: A Period Piece
Audience Award - Narrative Feature: Skin
Audience Award - Documentary Feature: Rock Prophecies
Dallas Star Award: Kathryn Bigelow

2010
Target Filmmaker Award - Documentary: Waste Land
Grand Jury Prize - Texas Competition (In-Competition): Hold and Carried Away
Special Jury Prize - Special Achievement (Direction): Careful What You Wish For - Tim Vogel
Special Jury Prize - Documentary Feature: The Last Survivor
Audience Award - Narrative Feature: Brotherhood
Dallas Star Award: Amber Heard

2011
Target Filmmaker Award - Narrative Feature: 5 Time Champion
Grand Jury Prize - Best Short Film: The Legend of Beaver Dam
Grand Jury Prize - Best Short Film (In-Competition): Crazy Beats Strong Every Time
Student Competition: The Robbery
Environmental Visions Grand Jury Prize: If a Tree Falls: A Story of the Earth Liberation Front
Special Jury Prize - Special Achievement (Direction): The Birds Upstairs - Christopher Jarvis
Special Jury Prize - Special Mention for Directing: Green Crayons - Kazik Radwanski
Special Jury Prize - Special Achievement (Acting): Surrogate Valentine - Goh Nakamura
Audience Award - Best Feature: Snowmen

2012
Grand Jury Prize - Best Short Film: Nani
Grand Jury Prize - Documentary: Tchoupitoulas
Grand Jury Prize - Texas Competition: Wolf
Grand Jury Prize - Narrative Feature: Faith, Love and Whiskey
Special Jury Prize - Silver Heart Award: The Invisible War
Silver Heart Award (In-Competition): 5 Broken Cameras
Audience Award - Best Short: Nani
Audience Award - Documentary Feature: First Position
Dallas Star Award: Gabourey Sidibe
Career Achievement in Costume Design: Bernie Pollack

2013
Grand Jury Prize - Best Short Film (In-Competition): Gun and The Devil's Ballroom and Matriarche
Grand Jury Prize - Texas Competition: Pit Stop
Student Competition: The First Hope
Grand Jury Prize - Narrative Feature (In-Competition): He's Way More Famous Than You
Special Jury Prize - Silver Heart Award (In Competition): Small Small Thing
Best HD Feature (In-Competition): Azooma
Audience Award - Documentary Feature: The Crash Reel
Audience Award - Narrative Feature: The Kings of Summer
Best Feature Documentary Award: Small Small Thing

2014
Animated Short Grand Jury Prize: The Missing Scarf
Grand Jury Prize - Best Short Film (In-Competition): The Bravest, the Boldest and Easy
Grand Jury Prize - Documentary: The Special Need
Grand Jury Prize - Texas Competition: Flutter
Grand Jury Prize - Narrative Feature: Hellion
Special Jury Prize - Short Film: Easy
Special Jury Prize - Shorts Competition: Ni-Ni
Audience Award - Documentary Feature: Queens & Cowboys: A Straight Year on the Gay Rodeo
Audience Award - Narrative Feature: Noble

2015
Grand Jury Award - Animated Short Film: World of Tomorrow
Grand Jury Award - Short Film: The Chicken
Grand Jury Award - Documentary Feature: Barge
Grand Jury Award - Texas Competition: Sacrifice
Grand Jury Award - Narrative Feature: Radiator
Grand Jury Award - Student Short Film: Cast in India
Special Jury Prize - Narrative Feature, Ensemble Acting: Echoes of War
Special Jury Prize - Narrative Feature, Cinematography: Some Beasts
Special Jury Prize - Short Film: The Face of Ukraine: Casting Oksana Baiul
Special Jury Prize - Texas Competition, Ensemble Performance: The Love Inside
Audience Award - Documentary Feature: Batkid Begins: The Wish Heard Around the World
Audience Award - Narrative Feature: Thunder Broke the Heavens
Audience Award - Short Film: Melville
Silver Heart Award - Frame By Frame

2016
Grand Jury Award - Animated Short Film: Snowfall
Grand Jury Award - Short Film: The Black Belt
Grand Jury Award - Documentary Feature: The Pearl
Grand Jury Award - Texas Competition: Tower
Grand Jury Award - Narrative Feature: Mr. Pig
Grand Jury Award - Student Short Film: Fata Morgana
Special Jury Prize - Narrative Feature, Performance: Arianna
Special Jury Prize - Documentary Feature: In Pursuit of Silence
Special Jury Prize - Short Film: Minor Setback
Special Jury Prize - Texas Competition: Booger Red
Special Jury Prize - Student Short Film: The Mink Catcher
Audience Award - Documentary Feature: Until Proven Innocent
Audience Award - Narrative Feature: Transpecos
Audience Award - Short Film: So Good to See You
Silver Heart Award - Hooligan Sparrow
Dallas County Historical Commission (DCHC) Historical Film: Footprint

2017
Grand Jury Award - Animated Short Film: Mr. Madila
Grand Jury Award - Short Film: What Happened to Her
Grand Jury Award - Documentary Feature: Quest
Grand Jury Award - Texas Competition: Mr. Roosevelt
Grand Jury Award - Narrative Feature: The Relationtrip
Special Jury Prize - Narrative Feature, Directing: Heartstone
Special Jury Prize - Documentary Feature, Artistry: Spettacolo
Special Jury Prize - Short Film: Hairat
Special Jury Prize - Short Film, Performance: Arin MacLaine, Spring
Audience Award - Documentary Feature: Dealt
Audience Award - Narrative Feature: Bomb City
Audience Award - Short Film: No Other Way to Say It
Silver Heart Award - City of Ghosts

2018
Grand Jury Award - Animated Short Film: Agua Viva
Grand Jury Award - Narrative Short Film: Krista
Grand Jury Award - Documentary Feature: The Blessing
Grand Jury Award - Documentary Short Film: Adversary
Grand Jury Award - Texas Competition: 1985
Grand Jury Award - Narrative Feature: Dead Pigs
Special Jury Prize - Narrative Feature: Madeline's Madeline
Special Jury Prize - Documentary Short: An Uncertain Future
Special Jury Prize - Midnight Short: Mobius
Special Jury Prize - Texas Competition: The Iron Orchard
Special Jury Prize - Short Film, Comedy: Allen Anders: Live at the Comedy Castle Circa 1987
Audience Award - Documentary Feature: Loud Krazy Love
Audience Award - Documentary Short: Tomnoddy
Audience Award - Narrative Feature: Tejano
Audience Award - Narrative Short: Caroline

2019
Grand Jury Award - Animated Short Film: Reneepoptosis
Grand Jury Award - Narrative Short Film: Rapaz
Grand Jury Award - Documentary Feature: Always in Season
Grand Jury Award - Documentary Short Film: Mack Wrestles
Grand Jury Award - Texas Competition: J.R. "Bob" Dobbs and the Church of the SubGenius
Grand Jury Award - Narrative Feature: Ms. Purple
Special Jury Prize - Narrative Short: Okaasan
Special Jury Prize - Documentary Feature: Caballerango
Special Jury Prize - Documentary Short: Gli anni
Special Jury Prize - Narrative Feature, Screenplay: Sister Aimee
Special Jury Prize - Texas Competition: Shoot the Moon Right Between the Eyes
Audience Award - Documentary Feature: Alice Cooper: Live from the Astroturf
Audience Award - Documentary Short: The Queen's New Clothes
Audience Award - Narrative Feature: This World Won't Break
Dallas County Historical Commission (DCHC) Historical Film: Seadrift

2022

 Grand Jury Prize - Best Narrative Feature: Acidman
 Grand Jury Prize - Best Documentary Feature: Last Flight Home
 Grand Jury Prize - Best Texas Feature: A Run for More
 Grand Jury Prize - Best Short Film: My Summer Vacation
 Grand Jury Prize - Best Texas Short Film: Hundreds of Thousands
 Audience Award - Best Documentary Feature: Song For Hope
 Audience Award - Best Narrative Feature: Roll With It
 Audience Award - Best Short Film: My Summer Vacation

References

External links

 
 

501(c)(3) organizations
Annual events in Texas
Film festivals in Dallas
Non-profit organizations based in Texas